Langisjór is a lake in the western part of Vatnajökull National Park, Iceland.

The lake is situated rather far from civilisation at the south-western border of Vatnajökull at an altitude of 670 m above sea level. Environmental campaigners have expressed concern at government plans to site an industrial dam on the lake.

See also
List of lakes of Iceland

References

External links
 Official Website of Vatnajökull National Park
 Photos: http://isafold.de/strutsstigur02/img_voetn.htm

Lakes of Iceland
Rift lakes of Iceland